Joanna is a feminine given name deriving from  from . Variants in English include Joan, Joann, Joanne, and Johanna. Other forms of the name in English are Jan, Jane, Janet, Janice, Jean, and Jeanne.

The earliest recorded occurrence of the name Joanna, in Luke 8:3, refers to the disciple "Joanna the wife of Chuza," who was an associate of Mary Magdalene. Her name as given is Greek in form, although it ultimately originated from the Hebrew masculine name יְהוֹחָנָן Yəhôḥānān or יוֹחָנָן Yôḥānān meaning 'God is gracious'. In Greek this name became Ιωαννης Iōannēs, from which Iōanna was derived by giving it a feminine ending. The name Joanna, like Yehohanan, was associated with Hasmonean families. Saint Joanna was culturally Hellenized, thus bearing the Grecian adaptation of a Jewish name, as was commonly done in her milieu.

At the beginning of the Christian era, the names Iōanna and Iōannēs were already common in Judea. The name Joanna and its equivalents became popular for women "all at once" beginning in the 12th century in Navarre and the south of France. In England, the name did not become current until the 19th century.

The original Latin form Joanna was used in English to translate the equivalents in other languages; for example, Juana la Loca is known in English as Joanna the Mad. The variant form Johanna originated in Latin in the Middle Ages, by analogy with the Latin masculine name Johannes. The Greek form lacks a medial -h- because in Greek /h/ could only occur initially.

The Hebrew name יוֹחָנָה Yôḥānāh forms a feminine equivalent in Hebrew for the name Joanna and its variants. The Christian Arabic form of John is يوحنّا Yūḥannā, based on the Judeo-Aramaic form of the name. For Joanna, Arabic translations of the Bible use يونّا Yuwannā based on Syriac ܝܘܚܢ Yoanna, which in turn is based on the Greek form Iōanna.

Sometimes in modern English Joanna is reinterpreted as a compound of the two names Jo and Anna, and therefore given a spelling like JoAnna, Jo-Anna, or Jo Anna. However, the original name Joanna is a single unit, not a compound. The names Hannah, Anna, Anne, Ann are etymologically related to Joanna just the same: they are derived from Hebrew חַנָּה Ḥannāh 'grace' from the same verbal root meaning 'to be gracious'.

In other languages

 Amharic - ዮሐና Yohäna
 Albanian - Xhoana
 Arabic - يُوَنّا Yuwannā
 Armenian - Յովհաննա (Hovhanna), Օհաննա (Ōhanna)
 Basque language - Jone, Joana, Joane
 Breton - Janed
 Bulgarian - Йоана (Joana/Yoana), Ivana, Yana; diminutive: Яниџa (Yanizza, Yanitza, Yanitsa)
 Catalan - Joana
 Chinese - Modern  Qiáo ān nà (literally 'tall, peaceful, graceful'), Biblical  Yāo yà ná
 Croatian - Ivana, Jana, Janja
 Czech - Jana, Johana
 Danish - Johanne
 Dawan - Yohana
 Dutch - Johanna, Joanna, diminutives Joke, Janneke
 Estonian - Joanna, Johanna
 Finnish - Johanna, Joanna, Jonna, Janette, Janna, Jaana, Hanne
 Filipino - Juana
 French - Jeanne, diminutive Jeannette, Janine, Old French - Jehane
 Galician - Xoana
 Georgian - იოანნა Ioanna
 German - Johanna, diminutive Hanne
 Greek -  (Ioanna), Modern Greek - Γιάννα (Giánna), diminutive Γιαννούλα Yannoula
 Hebrew - יוחנה Yoḥanah, יוהנה Yohannah
 Hungarian - Johanna, Jana, diminutive Hanna, Janka
 Icelandic - Jóhanna
 Indonesian - Yohana
 Irish - Siobhán (after French Jeanne), diminutive Sinéad (after French Jeannette)
 Italian - Giovanna, diminutive Gianna, Giannina, Vanna, Nina, Zana, Ivana
 Korean - Modern 조안나 Joanna, Biblical 요안나 Yoanna
 Latin - Joanna, Johanna
 Lithuanian - Joana
 Macedonian - Ivana, diminutive Ива (Iva); Јована (Jovana), diminutives Јованка (Jovanka), Јовка (Jovka), Yana
 Malayalam - യോഹന്ന Yōhannā
 Persian - جوانا Jovannā
 Polish - Joanna, diminutive Joasia, Asia, Asieńka, Aśka, Asiunia
 Portuguese - Joana
 Romanian - Ioana
 Russian - Яна (Yana), Жанна (Zhanna), Иoaннa (Ioanna, Greek form); diminutives Янина (Yanina), Яника (Yanika)
 Serbian - Јована (Jovana), diminutive Јованка (Jovanka)
 Slovak - Jana
 Slovenian - Jana
 Spanish - Juana, diminutive Juanita, Nita
 Swedish - Johanna, diminutive Hanna
 Syriac - ܝܘܚܢ Yoanna
 Tamil - யோவன்னா Yōvannā
 Tetum - Joana
 Ukrainian - Іванна (Ivanna), Іоанна (Ioanna)
 Vèneto - Joana (pronounced // and //)
 Welsh - Siân

Women named Joanna

Religion
 Saint Joanna, one of the women associated with the ministry of Mary Magdalene. She brought myrrh to Christ's sepulcher and helped discover the empty tomb (Luke 24:10).
 Joanna (prioress of Lothen), twelfth century nun
 Joanna Southcott (1750–1814), English prophetess

Royals and noblewomen
 Joanna of Constantinople (c. 1199–1244), Countess of Flanders
 Joanna of Flanders (c. 1295–1374), Duchess of Brittany
 Joanna, Duchess of Brabant (1322–1406)
 Joanna, Duchess of Durazzo (1344–1387)
 Joanna I of Naples (1371–1435)
 Joanna of Bourbon (1338–1378)
 Joanna II of Naples (1371–1435)
 Joanna of Navarre (c. 1368–1437), consort of King Henry IV of England
 Saint Joana, Crown Princess of Portugal (1452–1490)
 Joanna of Castile (1479–1555), queen regnant of Castile, known as Joanna the Mad
 Joanna of Austria, Princess of Portugal (1535–1573)
 Joanna of Austria, Grand Duchess of Tuscany (1547–1578)
 Joanna Nobilis Sombre (c. 1753–1836), Begum Samru of Sardhana

Other
 Joanna Ampil, Filipina musical theater actress and singer
 Joanna Angel (born 1980), American porn actress
 Joanna Baillie (1762–1851), Scottish poet and playwright
 Joanna Barnes, American actress
 Joanna Bolme (born 1968), American indie rock musician
 Joanna Briscoe (born 1963), English novelist
 Joanna Brouk (1949–2017), American composer
 Joanna Bruzdowicz (1943–2021), Polish composer
 Joanna Cameron (1951–2021), American actress 
 Joanna Cassidy (born 1945), American actress
 Joanna Clark (born 1938), American nun, naval officer, and activist
 Joanna Cole (disambiguation), several people
 Joanna Connor (born 1962), American blues musician
 Joanna David (born 1947), British actress
 Joanna Denny (died 2006), British historian
 Joanna Dennehy (born 1982), British serial killer
 Jo-Anna Downey (1967–2016), Canadian comedian
 Joanna Dong (born 1981), Singaporean singer-songwriter
 Jo Anna Dossett, American politician
 Joanna Dunham (1936–2014), British actress
 Joanna Eden, British jazz singer
 Joanna Forest, British classical crossover singer
 Joanna Gaines (born 1978), American reality TV personality
 Joanna Garcia (born 1979), American actress
Joanna Glass (born 1936), Canadian playwright
 Joanna Gleason (born 1950), Canadian actress
 Joanna Going (born 1963), American actress
 Joanna (singer) (born 1957), stage name of Brazilian singer Maria de Fátima Gomes Nogueira
 Joanna Gosling (born 1971), British journalist
 Joanna Haigh (born 1954), British physicist and academic
 Joanna Harcourt-Smith (1946–2020), Swiss writer
 Joanna Hausmann (born 1989), Venezuelan-American comedian, actress, and writer
 Joanna Hayes (born 1976), American gold medalist in the 2004 Olympics
 Joanna Hiffernan (1843–1903), artist's model and muse from Ireland
 Joanna Hoffman (born 1953), Polish-born American computer executive
 Joanna Jędrzejczyk (born 1987), Polish mixed martial artists
 Joanna Kerns (born 1953), American actress 
 Joanna Klepko (born 1983), Polish singer
 Joanna Krupa (born 1979), Polish-American model and actress
 Joanna Levesque (born 1990), American singer
 Joanna Lee (1931–2003), American screenwriter, actress, and producer
 Joanna Lumley (born 1946), English actress and former model
 JoAnna M. Lund (1944–2006), American author and cook
 Joanna MacGregor (born 1959), British classical, jazz, and contemporary pianist
 Joanna Macy (born 1929), American Buddhist scholar, author, and environmental activist
 Joanna de Albuquerquen Maranhão Bezerra de Melo (born 1987), Brazilian Olympic swimmer
 Joanna McGrenere, Canadian computer scientist
 Joanna Merlin (born Joann Ratner; 1931), American actress and casting director
 Joanna Moore (1934–1997), American actress
 Joanna Murray-Smith (born 1962), Australian author
 Joanna Newsom (born 1982), American harpist, singer, and songwriter
 Joanna Norris, New Zealand journalist
 Joanna Pacitti (born 1984), American singer, known simply as Joanna
 Joanna Page (born 1977), Welsh actress
 Joanna Pacuła (born 1957), Polish actress
 Joanna Parrish (1969–1990), English student murdered in France in 1990
 Joanna Pettet (born 1942), British actress
 Joanna Pousette-Dart, American artist
 Joanna Roos (1901–1989), American actress and playwright
 Joanna Roth (born 1965), Danish-British actress
 Joanna Russ (1937–2011), American science fiction author known for her writing on radical feminist themes
 Joanna Scanlan (born 1961), English actress and television writer
 Joanna Mary Berry Shields (1884–1965), American educator
 Joanna Shimkus (born 1943), Canadian actress
 Joanna Simon (mezzo-soprano) (1936–2022), American opera singer
 Joanna Simon (wine), British author and wine journalist
 Joanna Smolarek (born 1965), Polish track and field sprinter
 Joanna St. Claire, American singer and songwriter
 Joanna Stone (born 1972), Australian javelin thrower
 Joanna Sutton (born 1986), Australian netball player
 Joanna Townsend, Australian TV journalist
 Joanna Trollope (born 1943), British novelist
 Joanna Truffaut (born 1977), French digital transformation advisor and entrepreneur
 Joanna Wang (Wáng Ruòlín) (born 1988), Taiwanese singer and songwriter
 Joanna Yeates (1985–2010), English landscape architect and victim in a high-profile 2010 murder case
 Joanna Zeiger (born 1970), American Olympic and world champion triathlete, and author

Fictional characters
 Joanna Beauchamp, the lead character in Melissa de la Cruz's novel Witches of East End and the TV show made from it
 Joanna Chambers, a [[List of The Power of Five characters#Professor Joanna Chambers|scientist from the Power of Five series]] by Anthony Horowitz
 Joanna Dark, the main character in Perfect Dark Joanna Eberhart, the protagonist of The Stepford Wives by Ira Levin
 Joanna “Joey” Del Marco, a character in the Netflix series Grand Army The title character in the 1973 Brazilian film Joanna Francesa, played by Jeanne Moreau
 Joanna Beth "Jo" Harvelle, a hunter on Supernatural Joanna the Goanna, a pet lizard to antagonist Percival McLeach in Disney's The Rescuers Down Under The protagonist of the 1968 British film Joanna Joanna McCoy, daughter of Leonard McCoy of Star Trek Joanna May, title character in The Cloning of Joanna May, a science fiction novel by Fay Weldon
 Jo Parrish, a police constable on Blue Heelers Jo Polniaczek on The Facts of Life Lieutenant Joanna Reece on Forever''

Women named Ioanna
 Ioanna Anagnostopoulou (born 1997), Greek rhythmic gymnast
 Ioanna Babassika, Greek human rights lawyer
 Ioanna Chatziioannou (born 1973), retired female weightlifter from Greece
 Ioanna Filippou (born 1995), Cypriot beauty pageant title holder
 Ioanna Fotiadou (born 1977), Greek handball player
 Ioanna Karyofylli, Greek local politician
 Ioanna Karystiani (born 1952), Greek screenwriter
 Ioanna Kondouli, Greek politician and topographer engineer 
 İoanna Kuçuradi (born 1936), Turkish philosopher
 Ioanna Morfessis, American businesswoman
 Ioanna Papantoniou (born 1936), Greek author, scenic designer, costume designer and folklorist
 Ioanna Sfekas-Karvelas (born 1950), Greek American dramatic soprano
 Ioanna Stamatopoulou (born 1998), Greek water polo player
 Ioanna Tantcheva (born 1989), Bulgarian group rhythmic gymnast
 Ioanna Vlachou (born 1981), Greek volleyball player

See also
Joanne (given name)

References

External links
 "Joanna" at Edgar's Name Pages - with history, naming frequency statistics, related names, and famous namebearers

Given names of Greek language origin
Greek feminine given names
English feminine given names
Feminine given names
Filipino feminine given names
Latin feminine given names
Polish feminine given names
Scottish feminine given names
Welsh feminine given names

cs:Jana
da:Johanna
es:Juana
eo:Johana
fr:Jeanne
is:Jóhanna
it:Giovanna
hu:Johanna
nl:Johanna
pt:Joana
ru:Яна
sk:Jana (meno)
fi:Johanna
sv:Johanna